Casey are a Welsh rock band formed in South Wales, United Kingdom in 2014.

The band formed shortly after vocalist Tom Weaver and guitarist Liam Torrance left previous projects, Continents and Hot Damn respectively. Originally formed as a studio band under the name Well Wisher, Weaver and Torrance later recruited Toby Evans, Max Nicolai, and Scott Edwards, and began producing material with the intention of performing live. After a brief hiatus while Weaver auditioned to join the band Northlane, the name Well Wisher was dropped, and the band relaunched under the name Casey. The name is derived from both Weaver's love of the album Casey by The Rise of Science, and also Torrance's tribute to the late Hawthorne Heights guitarist, Casey Calvert.

Following their tour with Burning Down Alaska and Acres in April 2015, bassist Scott Edwards stepped down from the band, and was replaced by Adam Smith.

On 1 December 2018 the band released a statement explaining that they have decided to disband following a final UK/European tour and a one-off headline show in the US in 2019.

On 1 December 2022, the band announced a return to the music industry with a five date tour of Europe starting in January 2023.

Musical style
Casey's music has been described as "packed to the rafters with emotionally charged guitar lines and captivating, heartfelt lyrics"  and "mix of rhythmic atmosphere, spoken word, hardcore guitar and more into the tracks guaranteed to move you and tell you a vivid story.", leading to them being categorized as post-hardcore, melodic hardcore, hardcore punk, emotional hardcore, shoegazing and alternative rock

Members

Final line-up
Tom Weaver – lead vocals (2014-present)
Liam Torrance – lead guitar (2014-present)
Toby Evans – rhythm guitar, backing vocals (2014-present)
Adam Smith – bass (2015-present)
Max Nicolai – drums (2014-present)

Past members
Scott Edwards – bass (2014–2015)

Discography

Studio albums
Love Is Not Enough (2016)
Where I Go When I Am Sleeping (2018)

EPs
Haze (You Buried It) (2014)
Fade (2015)

Singles
"Hell" (2015)
"Teeth" (2015)
"Fade" (2015)
"Darling" (2016)
"Haze" (2016)
"Ceremony" (2016)
"Little Bird" (2017)
"Fluorescents" (2017)
"Phosphenes" (2018)
"Bruise" (2018)
"Great Grief" (2022)
”Atone” (2022)

References

Post-hardcore groups
Melodic hardcore groups
British hardcore punk groups
Welsh alternative rock groups
Musical groups established in 2013
2013 establishments in Wales